Elections were held in Prescott and Russell United Counties, Ontario on October 24, 2022 in conjunction with municipal elections across the province.

Prescott and Russell United Counties Council
The Prescott and Russell United Counties Council consists of the mayors of the eight constituent municipalities:

Alfred and Plantagenet
Stéphane Sarrazin, who was elected as mayor in 2018 was elected to provincial parliament in the 2022 Ontario general election for the Progressive Conservative Party of Ontario in Glengarry—Prescott—Russell. Yves Laviolette was appointed mayor in June 2022 to replace him. Laviolette ran for election as mayor, as did township councillors Chantal Galipeau and René Beaulne.

Casselman
Incumbent mayor Daniel Lafleur was challenged by Genevieve Lajoie.

Champlain
Incumbent mayor Norman Riopel was re-elected by acclamation. He was first elected in 2018.

Clarence-Rockland
The following were the results for mayor of Clarence-Rockland.

East Hawkesbury
Robert Kirby was re-elected as mayor of East Hawkesbury by acclamation.

Hawkesbury
Incumbent mayor Paula Assaly was challenged by town councillor Robert Lefebvre.

Russell
Incumbent mayor Pierre Leroux was re-elected by acclamation. He was first elected in a 2014 by-election.

The Nation
Municipal councillors Francis Brière and Marie-Noëlle Lanthier ran for mayor of The Nation. Incumbent mayor Francois St-Amour ran for Ward 1 councillor.

References

Prescott
United Counties of Prescott and Russell